Claudius Franciscus Gagnières des Granges (23 May 1722 – 2 September 1792) was a French Jesuit.

Born in Chambéry, he was one of the 191 victims of the September Massacres. He was beatified by Pope Pius XI in 1926.

References

1722 births
1792 deaths
French beatified people
18th-century French Jesuits
French clergy killed in the French Revolution
Place of birth missing